Darya Vladimirovna Pchelnik (also Daria or Dariya, ; ; born 20 December 1980 or 20 December 1981),  is a hammer thrower from Belarus. Her personal best is 76.33 metres, achieved in June 2008 in Minsk.

Pchelnik was born in Hrodna in the Byelorussian Soviet Socialist Republic of the Soviet Union. She first tried the hammer throw at age 18 under the coaching of Igor Tsitsorin and quickly committed to the event. She finished tenth at the 2005 Summer Universiade, won the 2007 Summer Universiade and finished fourth at the 2008 Olympic Games. In addition she competed at the 2005 World Championships without reaching the final. She had a strong start to the 2010 season after throwing 75.42 m to win at the Grande Prêmio Caixa Governo do Pará in May.

In 2016, Pchelnik's stored urine samples from the 2008 Olympic Games underwent re-analysis, which resulted in a positive test for the prohibited substance turinabol, an anabolic–androgenic steroid. On 10 January 2017, Pchelnik was officially disqualified from the 2008 Olympic Games due to doping violations. Her fourth place result was annulled and the diploma she obtained in the event was withdrawn.

Achievements

References

External links
 
 
 

1981 births
Living people
Belarusian female hammer throwers
Athletes (track and field) at the 2008 Summer Olympics
Olympic athletes of Belarus
Sportspeople from Grodno
Belarusian sportspeople in doping cases
Doping cases in athletics
Universiade medalists in athletics (track and field)
Universiade gold medalists for Belarus
Medalists at the 2007 Summer Universiade